Kit Swartz was a television producer, for CNN,
and he is currently a freelance photographer.

He was a soundman at the Tiananmen Square protests of 1989 with Cynde Strand.
He was a cameraman for "Europe on the Brink", which won a 1992 CINE Golden Eagle award.
He was also a member of the band Love Tractor during his time at University of Georgia, which was critically acclaimed as one of the founders of the Athens alternate rock scene.

Awards
2009 George Polk Award
2009 'International Television & Radio', Amnesty International UK Media Awards

References

American television producers
Year of birth missing (living people)
Living people
George Polk Award recipients